The flag of Harare is the civil flag for the capital city of Zimbabwe.

History 
The flag was adopted on 18 April 1982, when the capital city of Zimbabwe was renamed Harare from the original, Salisbury. When the city was renamed it adopted a new flag and a new coat of arms replacing those of Salisbury, which bore the Latin motto Discrimine Salus ("In Discrimination there is Safety"), the family motto of William Fairbridge, the first mayor of the city.

Similarities 
The Flag of Harare, like the Flag of Zimbabwe, contains the Zimbabwe Bird, the country's national symbol. The flag also contains similarities to other African flags in that it contains some of the Pan-African colours.

Gallery

References

Flags of Zimbabwe
Flags of cities
National symbols of Zimbabwe
flag
Flags introduced in 1982